David Johnson (born 1950) was the Iowa State Senator from the 1st District and served as assistant minority leader. A former Republican and currently independent, he served in the Iowa Senate from 2003 to 2019 and served in the Iowa House of Representatives from 1999 to 2003.  He received his B.A. in History from Beloit College.

Johnson served on several committees in the Iowa Senate – the Appropriations committee; the Education committee; the Human Resources committee; the Natural Resources committee; and the Agriculture committee, where he was the ranking member.  He also served as the ranking member of the Health and Human Services Appropriations Subcommittee.

2006 election
In his 2006 bid for re-election, Johnson received 12,328 votes (57%), defeating Democratic opponent Mel Berryhill.

Early life and education
Johnson was born and raised in West Branch, Iowa, and graduated from West Branch High School. He then went on to obtain his B.A. in history from Beloit College in Wisconsin.

Career

After graduating college, he went on three scientific expeditions. For all three trips to Antarctica and the Arctic, he was the camp manager. Outside politics, Johnson works on an Osceola County dairy farm. He then went on to become a newspaper publisher and editor where he won a number of awards for his work in journalism. For several years he served as president of the Chamber of Commerce.

In July 2015, upon receiving an email from a teacher asking for him to reconsider his stance on an education vote, Senator Johnson wrote "quit whining".

In June 2016, Johnson changed his party affiliation to "No Party", citing his opposition to the Republican Party's support for U.S. presidential candidate Donald Trump. He stated, "Many of the voters who elected me are supporting Mr. Trump. I respect that, but disagree that he is qualified to lead the nation and the free world." In 2019 Johnson joined the Democratic Party.

Awards and honors
Johnson has won a number of awards from the following:
 Distinguished Service Award
 Iowa Newspaper Association
 Iowa FFA and Iowa High School Football Coaches Association
 Legislator of the Year
 Iowa Izaak Walton League
 Iowa Agribusiness Association
 Iowa Biotechnology Association and Iowa Safe Kids Coalition
 Guardian of Small Business Award — National Federation of Independent Business
 Iowa Association of Municipal Utilities
 Iowa Health Care Association
 Iowa Dental Association

References

External links

 Senator David Johnson official Iowa Legislature site
 Senator David Johnson official Iowa General Assembly site
 Senator David Johnson at Iowa Senate Republican Caucus

 Financial information (state office) at the National Institute for Money in State Politics

1950 births
Date of birth missing (living people)
Living people
Iowa state senators
Members of the Iowa House of Representatives
Beloit College alumni
Iowa Independents
Iowa Republicans
People from West Branch, Iowa
People from Osceola County, Iowa
21st-century American politicians
20th-century American politicians